Richard Alan Jones (born 6 November 1986) is an English cricketer who plays county cricket most recently for Leicestershire.

Jones was educated at The Grange School (now Pedmore Technology College) in Stourbridge and Loughborough University. He played for Worcestershire's Second XI as early as August 2004 (when he was 17) and appeared a number of times for them in 2005 and 2006. He was included on the England Under-19 tour to Bangladesh and Sri Lanka in 2005–06.

In late April 2007, after several matches in Worcestershire's pre-season warm-up games, he made his first-class debut against Loughborough UCCE at Worcester, taking four wickets in the match.

Jones signed a loan deal with Warwickshire on 22 August 2013 for the last few weeks of the season. He was signed as cover for injured Chris Wright (cricketer) and Oliver Hannon-Dalby and also England pair Chris Woakes and Boyd Rankin. Unfortunately, Jones was injured in a net session without appearing for Warks.

Jones was released from his Worcester contract on 12 November 2013 to join Warwickshire in a one-year deal.

Soon into his Warwickshire career, Jones was loaned out to Leicestershire on a one-month deal from 13 June 2014. In his debut for Leicester he took an astonishing 5–34 in a NatWest t20 Blast game against Lancashire.

References

External links

1986 births
Living people
English cricketers
Worcestershire cricketers
Warwickshire cricketers
Leicestershire cricketers
Alumni of Loughborough University
People educated at King Edward VI College, Stourbridge
Sportspeople from Stourbridge
English cricketers of the 21st century